Indira Mount is a seabed mountain in the Antarctic Ocean (also known as the Southern Ocean). It was discovered during the First Indian Expedition to Antarctica (1981–82) when the team was moving from Mauritius to Antarctica. It was named as Indira Mount after the former Prime Minister of India Mrs Indira Gandhi by the expedition members.

References

H N Siddiquie, G C Bhattacharya, M C Pathak, S Z Qasim: Indira Mount — An Underwater Mountain in the Antarctic Ocean, - Scientific report of first Indian Expedition to Antarctica (DEPARTMENT OF OCEAN DEVELOPMENT, DOD Technical Publications 1, Borker Printers, Margao - Goa), page 161c(1983)
 

Geography of Antarctica
Indian Antarctic Programme